"The Woman who Rode Away" is a short story  by D. H. Lawrence. It was written in New Mexico during the summer of 1924 and  first published in The Dial in two installments in 1925. It later became the title story for a collection of Lawrence's shorter fictional works issued in 1978 by Martin Secker in the UK and Alfred A. Knopf in the US.
The cave that features at the end of the story was inspired by a visit to a cave on Lucero Peak which overlooks the town of Arroyo Seco, New Mexico.

The story was inspired by Lawrence's association with Mabel Dodge Luhan (1879–1962).

Standard edition

See also 
 The Plumed Serpent

External links
 Full text of "The Woman who Rode Away" at HathiTrust Digital Library:
 Part 1
 Part 2

1928 short story collections
1925 short stories
Short story collections by D. H. Lawrence
Short stories by D. H. Lawrence
Works originally published in The Dial
Martin Secker books